The Old Fashioned Way may refer to:

 The Old Fashioned Way (film), a 1934 film starring W. C. Fields
 The Old Fashioned Way (song), the English version of Charles Aznavour's song Les plaisirs démodés

See also
 Old Fashioned Way, a song by Canadian singer-songwriter Hayden on the EP Moving Careful